North American Coal Corporation (NACC) is an American coal mining and mining services company. The company, now held as the main subsidiary of NACCO, is headquartered in Dallas, Texas and operates coal mines in North Dakota, Louisiana, Mississippi, and Texas. The company also contracts to provide dragline mining services to limestone quarries in Florida.

History

Mines
North American Coal Corporation's coal mines are all surface mines producing lignite coal. At 35 million tons of annual production, NACC is the largest lignite coal producer in the United States, and also ranks among the top ten of all coal producers.  

Of the above mines, three ranked among the largest United States coal mines by production in 2007:
Freedom Mine, North Dakota: 15.0 million short tons produced in 2007, ranked 12th
Falkirk Mine, North Dakota: 7.8 million short tons produced in 2007, ranked 21st
Sabine, South Hallsville No 1 Mine, Texas: 4.2 million short tons produced in 2007, ranked 48th

References

Coal companies of the United States
Companies based in Dallas
Energy companies established in 1913
Non-renewable resource companies established in 1913